Ialibu Basin Rural LLG is a local-level government (LLG) of Southern Highlands Province, Papua New Guinea.

Wards
01. Kalipinie
02. Kou
03. Kero 1
04. Kero 2
05. Poneglama
06. Kongibugl 1
07. Kongibugl 2
08. Bimbene 1
09. Bibine 2
10. Kapoglpopilie
11. Yombi 1
12. Yawalangil 1
13. Topel/Kopri
14. Lepera
15. Pakulge
16. Yawalangil 2
18. Kendal 1
20. Iombi 2
21. Kalano
22. Maral

References

Local-level governments of Southern Highlands Province